The Scam is a 2009 crime thriller, the first South Korean film to tackle the stock market.

Plot
After losing everything, Hyun-soo (Park Yong-ha) spends five years glued to the computer screen as an unshaven, full-time "ant" (individual investor). He eventually reaches the top of the game after a painful diet of instant noodles and sacrificing the cost of three luxury sedans. He vows to quit once and for all when he achieves his goal, a nine-digit savings account that will support his mother and studious younger brother.

One day he hits the jackpot, not knowing that there are repercussions to disrupting a stock market scam. He ignites the fury of Hwang Jong-gu (Park Hee-soon), a gangster-turned-financier bidding for entry into the top percentile of the rich and powerful. A fresh mobster persona, Hwang feigns elegance in his initialized Italian shoes, only to resort to kicking people for dramatic effect. He also begins every sentence with an `"OK" even though he cannot tolerate the full English phrasings of his Korean-American partner.

Hwang, however, doesn't dwell on past indiscretions. He recognizes Hyun-soo's talents and employs him for the biggest scam yet, also giving him a nice makeover. Hyun-soo joins the other members of Hwang's dream team for the 60 billion won heist: Jo Min-hyeong, an elite stock broker who doubles as the think tank of fraudulent trades (musical star Kim Mu-yeol makes his big screen debut); sexy private banker Yoo Seo-yeon (Kim Min-jung); Park Chang-joo, a second-generation chaebol CEO facing a management crisis (veteran supporting actor Jo Deok-hyun); and Bryan Choi (Kim Jun-seong), a Korean-American fund manager who fakes foreign investment as a "black-haired foreigner."

These are professional stock gamblers who win the house by reading everyone else's cards. They opt for new scientific technology, the cream of the crop for stock scams. Park's chaebol company invests heavily in a friend's new environmental research and Seo-yeon has one of her clients buy the company's shares. They have a famous broadcaster hype public attention while Bryan creates the illusion of foreign investment, and the cash starts flowing in from blind "ants."

A bigger scam, however, unfolds within the ring of scam artists. Outsider Hyun-soo becomes the ultimate insider as he becomes the pawn in a tangled web of backstabbing intrigue.

Cast
 Park Yong-ha ... Kang Hyun-soo, individual investor
 Kim Min-jung ... Yoo Seo-yeon, financial planner
 Park Hee-soon ... Hwang Jong-gu, gangster-turned-financier
 Kim Mu-yeol ... Jo Min-hyeong, bond broker
 Jo Deok-hyun ... Park Chang-joo, big stockbroker
 Kim Jun-seong ... Brian Choi, Korean-American fund manager
 Lee Dong-yong ... Department chief Han
 Jo Jae-yoon ... Deputy Lee
 Park Jae-woong ... Deok-sang
 Shin Hyun-jong ... Scholar Woo
 Kwon Hyung-joon ... Kin Seung-beom
 Yoo Seung-mok ... Yoon Sang-tae
 Kim Seung-hoon ... Lee Jae-hak 
 Jeon Gook-hwan ... Masan Chang-too 
 Lee Yeong-ih ... Hyun-soo's mother
 Park Yong-yeon ... Kang Joon-soo
 Bae Ho-geun ... Park Ji-hyeok
 Kim Young-hoon ... Secretary Nam

Critical Reception

References

External links
  
 
 
 

2000s Korean-language films
2009 films
2009 crime thriller films
Trading films
South Korean crime thriller films
2000s South Korean films
Sponge Entertainment films
Showbox films